The men's 800 metre event at the 1928 Olympic Games took place between July 29 & July 31. Forty-nine athletes from 24 nations competed. NOCs were limited to 4 competitors each. 

The event was won by Douglas Lowe of Great Britain, successfully defending his 1924 championship (the first man to do so in the 800 metres). It was the third of what ultimately would be four straight British victories in the event, and the fourth overall title for Great Britain in the 800 metres. Erik Byléhn's silver was Sweden's first 800 metres medal. Hermann Engelhard matched Germany's best-ever result in the event (Germany had previously won bronze in 1908).

Background

This was the eighth appearance of the event, which is one of 12 athletics events to have been held at every Summer Olympics. Three finalists from 1924 returned: gold medalist Douglas Lowe of Great Britain, silver medalist Paul Martin of Switzerland, and ninth-place finisher Harry Houghton of Great Britain. The competitive field was led by Lowe (defending champion and 1928 AAA winner), Otto Peltzer of Germany (880 yard world record holder), Séra Martin of France (800 metres world record holder), and Lloyd Hahn of the United States (1928 AAU champion, who had broken the world record at the U.S. Olympic trials a few days before Séra Martin ran even faster; Hahn's record was never ratified).

Argentina and India appeared in the event for the first time. Great Britain and the United States each made their seventh appearance, tied for the most among all nations.

Competition format

The competition used the three-round format introduced in 1912, with the nine-man final introduced in 1920. There were eight first-round heats of between 4 and 7 athletes each; the top three runners in each heat advanced to the semifinals. There were three semifinals with 8 athletes each; the top three runners in each semifinal advanced to the nine-man final.

Records

These were the standing world and Olympic records (in minutes) prior to the 1928 Summer Olympics.

Douglas Lowe broke the Olympic record by 0.1 seconds in the final, setting the new record at 1:51.8.

Schedule

Results

Round 1

The first three finishers in each of the eight heats advanced to the semifinal round.

Heat 1

Heat 2

Heat 3

Heat 4

Heat 5

Heat 6

Heat 7

Heat 8

Semifinals

The three fastest runners from each of the three heats advanced to the final.

Semifinal 1

Semifinal 2

Semifinal 3

Final

References

Men's 800 metre
800 metres at the Olympics
Men's events at the 1928 Summer Olympics